The 2020–21 Scottish Lowland Football League was the 8th season of the Lowland Football League, the fifth tier of the Scottish football pyramid system. Kelty Hearts were the reigning champions.

The league consisted of 17 teams as no clubs were relegated at the end of the 2019–20 season and East of Scotland champions Bo'ness United were promoted after gaining their SFA membership in June 2020. 

The start of the league season was delayed until October 2020 because of the COVID-19 pandemic, and games were played behind closed doors due to Scottish Government restrictions. On 11 January 2021 the league was suspended by the Scottish Football Association due to the escalating pandemic situation. On 30 March the league announced that a majority of clubs had voted to curtail the season, with a points per game basis used to finalise standings and Kelty Hearts were declared as the champions.

They faced the winners of the 2020–21 Highland Football League (Brora Rangers) in the Pyramid play-off, winning 6–1 on aggregate. Kelty then defeated Brechin City 3–1 on aggregate in the League Two play-off final to gain a place in Scottish League Two.

Teams

The following teams changed division after the 2019–20 season.

To Lowland League
Promoted from East of Scotland League
 Bo'ness United

Stadia and locations

Notes

All grounds are equipped with floodlights.

Personnel and kits

League summary

League table

Positions by round

Results

Top scorers

Lowland League play-off
A three match round robin play-off was due to take place between the winners of the 2020–21 East of Scotland Football League, the 2020–21 South of Scotland Football League, and the 2020–21 West of Scotland Football League, subject to all three clubs meeting the required licensing criteria for promotion. However all three leagues were declared null and void so there was no play-off or promotion to the Lowland League.

References

External links

5
Lowland Football League seasons
SCO